Mary Francis Ames (1853-1929), born Mary Frances Leslie Miller, authored and illustrated children's books in Great Britain and Canada as Ernest Ames or Mrs. Ernest Ames.

Ames' books include An ABC, for Baby Patriots (1899), which was used for teaching children the alphabet, The Bedtime Book (1901), Wonderful England!: Or, The Happy Land (1902), a patriotic paean, Tim and the Dusty Man (1903), The Great Crusade: an alphabet for everybody (1903), Little Red Fox (1908), Watty: a white puppy (1913).

Ames also illustrated Really and Truly! Or, the Century for Babes (1899), The Tremendous Twins or How the Boers Were Beaten (1900), The Maid's Progress (1901), and Sessional: Big Ben ballads (1906), to accompany text written by her husband Ernest Fitzroy Ames, a railroad engineer.

References

External links
An ABC, for Baby Patriots (1899) openly online for free within the Baldwin Library of Historical Children's Literature
Information on The Tremendous Twins or How the Boers Were Beaten 

British children's writers
British children's book illustrators
1853 births
1929 deaths